Cesarians 1 is the debut album released by a London-based band The Cesarians in 2009.

Musicians and personnel

Musicians
 Charlie Finke – vocals, harmonica
 Justine Armatage – piano, keyboards, celeste
 Jan Noble – drums, voice on "About She Goes"
 Alison Beckett – clarinet/tenor saxophone
 Ali Hutchinson - tenor horn
 Suzi Owen - trombone

Production personnel
Craig Leon – producer
 Andrew Dudman - engineer
 Cassell Webb - production assistant
 Gordon Davidson - assistant engineer
 Greg Calbi - mastering
 Management - Don Mousseau
 Ali Hutchinson - design
 Mark Bond and Sophie Tomlinson - photography

Track listing
All songs written by Armatage / Finke except About She Goes by Jan Noble 

2009 debut albums
Albums produced by Craig Leon